Craughwell (historically Creaghmoyle, from ) is a village and townland in County Galway, Ireland, with a population of under 1,000.

Etymology
The name of the area is composed of two Irish words: creach, meaning in this case "plunder", presumably in reference to herds of cattle, which were often targets of thefts and cattle raids amongst the Gaels. An alternate etymology of creach is related to craig, and creag, and the English word crag, which refers to a rock, or the bare rock crest of a hill (related words are cruach, for a mountain, pinnacle, or a rounded hill that stands apart or for any type of pile, or heap, and cnoc, for a hill or eminence); and maol, which is a word for a round-shaped hill or mountain, bare of trees. These two changes alter the sound of maol to mhaoil. The two words together, therefore, sounds to an English ear like Crockwell, or Craughwell, and it is Anglicised thus (the Gaelic personal names Seán (John) and Seamus (James) became Iain and Hamish in Scotland by similar means).

Patrick W. Joyce, the pioneer of Irish placename studies, speculated that the name in Irish was Creamhchoill, ('garlic wood'). He was unaware of the local spelling and pronunciation but confirmed in a later work that the village was called Creachmhaoil in Irish.

The name Craughwell is also used as a surname, properly Ó Creachmhaoil, though often anglicised as Craughwell, Croughwell and Crockwell. The surname was largely unknown outside of the southeast of County Galway until the end of the 19th century when émigrés established families which still thrive in Barbados, Newfoundland, Bermuda, Cornwall, Ohio and Berkshire County, Massachusetts, among other places.

Amenities
The village currently (2023) has a parish church, two pubs, a Garda station, a pharmacy, a furniture store, post office, hairdressers, a service station, a lawnmower shop, a barbers shop, an athletics track, two cafes/restaurants, a photographers studio, two fitness studios, a sustainable living gift shop, coffee dock, a window/door glazing company, a stove/heating business and a pizzeria and fish and chip shop.

Notable people
The village of Creachmhaoil celebrates its connection with the Gaelic poet Antoine Ó Raifteiri, John Huston and Anjelica Huston, and provides the surnames of notables including American painter Douglass Crockwell the Bermudian parliamentarian Shawn Crockwell, JP, MP, the late Bermudian FIFA-certified football referee and Honorary Life Vice-President of the Bermuda Football Association Carlyle McNeil Eugene Crockwell, Bermudian footballer Mikkail Kristopher Crockwell, Bermudian cricketer Fiqre Crockwell, English cricketer Leslie Crockwell, Guinness World Record holding rower Matthew Craughwell, and American author Thomas J. Craughwell.

See also
 Craughwell GAA
 Craughwell railway station
 List of towns and villages in Ireland

References

External links

Craughwell GAA Club

Towns and villages in County Galway